Psychic Squad, known in Japan as , is a Japanese manga series written and illustrated by Takashi Shiina. It was serialized in Shogakukan's shōnen manga magazine Weekly Shōnen Sunday from July 2005 to July 2021, with its chapters collected in 63 tankōbon volumes. It is the story about three young problem girls with outstanding psychic powers and a young man with no special powers at all tasked to guide them properly while dealing with all the commotions they cause, including their obvious infatuation with him.

A 51-episode anime television series produced by SynergySP was broadcast from April 2008 to March 2009, and had a special original video animation (OVA) released in July 2010. A 12-episode spin-off focused on main antagonist Kyōsuke Hyōbu, titled Unlimited Psychic Squad, and produced by Manglobe, was broadcast from January to March 2013.

By July 2012, the manga had over 6 million copies in circulation. In 2022, Psychic Squad received the 53rd Seiun Award for Best Comic.

Plot

In the future, as people with ESP increase in numbers, so does the possible good and evil they can cause to society. The Japanese government establishes of the Base of Backing ESP Laboratory (B.A.B.E.L.) a special esper organization tasked with dealing with situations that can't be resolved by ordinary means, including dealing with espers engaged in criminal activity. Kōichi Minamoto, a 20-year-old prodigy is assigned by B.A.B.E.L. to the task of supervising the most powerful espers in the country, a trio of gifted but mischievous 10-year-old girls known as "The Children": Kaoru Akashi, Shiho Sannomiya, and Aoi Nogami.

As the series progresses, The Children and Minamoto must deal with several enemy organizations, each with conflicted views regarding the role of espers in the world, including "P.A.N.D.R.A.", a cadre of rogue espers determined to wage war against the rest of mankind, the "Black Phantom", a mercenary organization who brainwashes espers into living tools of destruction and the "Normal People", composed solely of non-esper individuals who view espers only as a threat to be vanquished.

Media

Manga
Zettai Karen Children, written and illustrated by Takashi Shiina, was developed out of a short story he had written in Shogakukan's shōnen manga magazine Shōnen Sunday Super in 2003. A 4-chapter story was then published in Weekly Shōnen Sunday in September 2004. Zettai Karen Children was serialized for 16 years in Weekly Shōnen Sunday, from July 27, 2005, to July 14, 2021. Shogakukan collected its 622 individual chapters in sixty-three tankōbon volumes, released from October 18, 2005, to September 17, 2021.

Volume list

Anime

An anime adaptation produced by SynergySP began airing in Japan on TV Tokyo on April 6, 2008, and contained fifty-one episodes (and one filler). The anime has six pieces of theme music; two opening themes and four ending themes. From episode 27 onwards opening theme has changed to "MY WINGS", once again by Karen Girl's, ending theme changed to "Break+Your+Destiny" by Yuuichi Nakamura, Kishō Taniyama and Kōji Yusa and "Soushunfu" performed by Aya Hirano, Ryoko Shiraishi and Haruka Tomatsu. In episode 46 of the series, the opening theme, "MY WINGS", was sung by Aya Hirano, Ryoko Shiraishi and Haruka Tomatsu while the ending theme was "Zettai love×love Sengen!!", sung by Karen Girl's.

An original video animation (OVA) was announced in December 2009. It was released on July 16, 2010, and includes original material based on the junior high school story arc. The opening theme for the OVA is "Seventh Heaven" by The Children and the ending theme is "Out of Control" by Karen Guy's.

In January 2012, Sentai Filmworks announced that they have licensed the series. Sentai Filmworks released the series on four DVDs in Japanese with English subtitles on May 1, July 17, September 4 and November 6, 2012.<ref></p></ref>

Video game
A video game for the Nintendo DS developed by Konami entitled  was released on September 4, 2008.

Kaoru Akashi appears as a fighter character in the fighting game  for Sony's PlayStation Portable. Characters Aoi, Shiho, Minamoto, Fujiko and Hyōbu also make appearances as part of special moves or as support. The game was also developed by Konami and released on March 26, 2009.

Reception
By July 2012, the manga had over 6 million copies in circulation. Psychic Squad was awarded the 53rd Seiun Award in the Best Comic category in 2022.

References

External links
 
 
Zettai Karen Children DS: Dai-4 no Children official website at Konami 

2005 manga
2008 Japanese novels
2008 anime television series debuts
Comedy anime and manga
Fiction about psychic powers
Gagaga Bunko
Light novels
NBCUniversal Entertainment Japan
Science fiction anime and manga
Sentai Filmworks
Shogakukan manga
Shōnen manga
Supernatural anime and manga
TV Tokyo original programming